Fugitive Watch is a reality-based cable television show, newspaper and web site, founded in 1992 by two San Francisco Bay Area police officers, Steve Ferdin and Scott Castruita.

It features stories on crimes and fugitives, and Ferdin and Castruita say that the service has led to over 1,200 arrests, thanks to viewers who provide tipoffs about where wanted criminals may be hiding.

As one law enforcement official stated, "Because of Fugitive Watch, there are millions of more eyes on the lookout for fugitives."

The service has been featured in newspapers and in nationally televised programs like World News Tonight with Peter Jennings, Inside Edition and Unsolved Mysteries. They have also televised Spanish language stories and have been featured in local Spanish language newscasts as well as international television programs like “Primer Impacto”.

Fugitive Watch has been endorsed and commended by California Governor Pete Wilson, the FBI and chiefs of police and sheriffs.

See also 
 Crimewatch, similar programme in the United Kingdom

References

External links

1990s American reality television series
2000s American reality television series
2010s American reality television series
1992 American television series debuts
1990s American crime television series
2000s American crime television series
2010s American crime television series
American news websites